Directive 65/65/EEC1 was the first European pharmaceutical directive. (Dated 26 January 1965.)

Intention
The directive was a reaction to the Thalidomide tragedy in the early 1960s, when thousands of babies were born with deformities as a result of their mothers taking the drug during pregnancy. The directive aimed at harmonising standards for the approval of medicines within the then European Economic Community

Regulation
The main article 3 of the directive requires that a Proprietary medicinal product could not be marketed within the community without prior authorisation of the competent authority of at least one member state. 
Proprietary medicinal product being defined as "Any ready-prepared medicinal product placed on the market under a special name and in a special pack."

See also
 EudraLex
 Kefauver Harris Amendment
 Regulation of therapeutic goods
 European Medicines Agency

References
 Maio G., On the history of the Contergan (thalidomide) catastrophe in the light of drug legislation, Dtsch Med Wochenschr. 2001 October 19;126(42):1183-6.	
 Shah RR., Thalidomide, drug safety and early drug regulation in the UK, Adverse Drug React Toxicol Rev. 2001 Dec;20(4):199-255.

External links
 Directive 65/65/EEC1
 New medicines legislation  (overview)

Health and the European Union
Pharmaceuticals policy
65 65
1965 in law
1965 in the European Economic Community